Radoslav Glavaš (29 October 1909 – June 1945) was a Herzegovinian Franciscan who headed the Department of Religion of the Ministry of Justice and Religion of the fascist Independent State of Croatia during the World War II.

A native of Drinovci near Grude in Herzegovina, Glavaš became a member of the Franciscan Province of Herzegovina in 1928. After finishing his studies at the Faculty of Humanities and Social Sciences, University of Zagreb, he taught the Croatian language and literature at the Franciscan gymnasium in Široki Brijeg. Known as a nationalist, he supported the puppet Independent State of Croatia (NDH), established by Nazi Germany and Italy in 1941. He became head of the Department of Religion at the Ministry of Justice and Religion of the NDH immediately after the establishment of the puppet state in May 1941 and held that post until the dissolution of the NDH in May 1945.

As an official at the Ministry of Justice and Religion, Glavaš was charged with setting up the procedures and regulations for mass conversion of the Serb Eastern Orthodox population to Catholicism, even though the Catholic Church's hierarchy opposed such a programme. He used his position to favour the Franciscan Province of Herzegovina, enabling the state sponsorship of its schools and state-controlled collection of financial revenues for the Franciscans. Despite the opposition from the Catholic Church, he enabled the establishment of the Franciscan Faculty of Theology in Sarajevo by the fascist government. Glavaš also used his position to oppose the appointment of Petar Čule, a secular priest, as a bishop of Mostar-Duvno, a position previously held by the Franciscans. For this reason, he was excommunicated by the papal delegate Ramiro Marcone in 1942.

Glavaš was executed by the Yugoslav Partisans for collaborating with the fascist regime in June 1945.

Early life 

Glavaš was born in Drinovci near Grude in the region of Herzegovina, at the time part of Austria-Hungary, to father Petar and mother Mara née Marinović. He was christened as Andrija by parson in Drinovci friar Vjenceslav Bašić. His baptismal godfather was Ivan Glavaš. Glavaš finished elementary school in Drinovci in 1921.

Afterward, Glavaš attended the Franciscan gymnasium in Široki Brijeg as an "internal" student, that is to become a priest and a monk. After finishing the sixth grade in 1927, Glavaš paused his education and entered a one-year novitiate at the Franciscan friary in Humac, Ljubuški on 29 June 1927. He changed his name to Radoslav and was ordained a monk by Lujo Bubalo. He returned to the gymnasium to finish the remaining two grades and graduated on 24 July 1930. Glavaš took his monastic vows in front of Provincial Dominik Mandić on 1 July 1928 and solemn vows on 3 July 1931, also in front of Mandić.

After finishing his high-school education, Glavaš enrolled at the Franciscan seminary in Mostar in 1930, where he studied until 1932. He continued his education in Lille, France. As he was not yet 24 years old, Glavaš asked Mandić to obtain permission for his premature priestly ordination. Mandić asked the Pope for permission for Glavaš to be ordained on 19 May 1933, which Pope granted. Glavaš was ordained a priest in Fontenoy, and Mandić was notified about the ordination on 17 July 1933. Glavaš remained in Lille another year and asked to return to Herzegovina, which was granted by Provincial Mate Čuturić on 1 July 1934.

After returning to Herzegovina, Glavaš served as a chaplain in Široki Brijeg from 1934 to 1935. He was then sent to study Croatian at the Faculty of Humanities and Social Sciences, University of Zagreb, after which he was supposed to return to the Franciscan gymnasium in Široki Brijeg to teach Croatian. As Herzegovinian Franciscans didn't own any accommodation in Zagreb, they lived in the monasteries of other Franciscan Provinces. Thus, Glavaš lived in the friary of the Croatian Franciscan Province of Saints Cyril and Methodius in Kaptol, Zagreb. Glavaš encountered several problems while living there, as he saw the statutory provisions and living style of these Franciscans as redundant and unnecessary and refused to wear the friar's clothes. The next year, the guardian of the Franciscan friary in Kaptol informed Čuturić that they cannot accommodate Glavaš anymore. Čuturić took up for Glavaš and asked the Zagreb Provincial Mihael Troha and the guardian of the friary to at least probe Glavaš until Christmas. His petition was accepted in October 1935, and Glavaš continued to live in Kaptol.

However, Troha again complained about Glavaš to Čuturić in 1938, informing him that Glavaš leaves the friary at whim and often returns after midnight. Čuturić requested that Glavaš returns to Mostar. Glavaš left Zagreb for Mostar in December 1938. In the meantime, the two Provincials agreed that Glavaš would continue his studies at the friary near Zagreb in Jaska. Glavaš finished all of his exams on 27 June 1939 and remained in Jaska until July. During the studies, Glavaš became a prominent nationalist and anti-communist amongst the students, and while studying met Mile Budak, a prominent Ustaše and later a member of the World War II fascist Government of the Independent State of Croatia (NDH). Glavaš wrote positive critiques of Budak's literal work. Glavaš spent vacations in Austria in 1936 and Germany in 1937 to learn German.

Čuturić asked him to return to Široki Brijeg to teach Croatian already in 1938, however, Glavaš asked him to prolong his studies. As he was preparing his doctoral thesis on Jakša Čedomil, a Catholic priest from Split, he asked Čuturić to ask the Franciscan friary in Dobro near Split to allow him to live there, as the majority of material about Čedomil could be found only in Split. His request was granted so he moved there in July 1939. He asked to remain in Dobro for an additional semester to finish his doctoral studies, however, Čuturić already appointed him professor in the Franciscan gymnasium in Široki Brijeg in April 1939 and refused his request. Thus, in September 1939, Glavaš started to lecture the Croatian language and literature in Široki Brijeg. This stalled his doctoral studies, so he defended his doctoral thesis only in 1942.

Independent State of Croatia 

In 1940 and early 1941, Hungary, Romania, and Bulgaria all agreed to adhere to the Tripartite Pact and thus join the Axis. Hitler then pressured Yugoslavia to join as well. The Regent, Prince Paul, yielded to this pressure and declared Yugoslavia's accession to the Pact on 25 March 1941. This move was highly unpopular with the Serb-dominated officer corps of the military and some segments of the public: a large part of the Serbian population, as well as liberals and Communists. Military officers (mainly Serbs) executed a coup d'état on 27 March 1941, and forced the Regent to resign, while King Peter II, though only 17, was declared of age. Upon hearing news of the coup in Yugoslavia, on 27 March Hitler issued a directive, which called for Yugoslavia to be treated as a hostile state. The Germans started an invasion with air assault on Belgrade on 6 April 1941. On 10 April 1941, the two Axis Powers, Germany and Italy, established its puppet Independent State of Croatia (NDH).

The establishment of the NDH was welcomed amongst the professors of the Franciscan gymnasium in Široki Brijeg. Glavaš openly supported the newly established fascist regime. However, the gymnasium's administration sanctioned political outbursts amongst its students, with many students being expelled because of their political activity.

Budak became Minister of Justice and Religion of the newly established NDH and asked the Herzegovinian Provincial Krešimir Pandžić on 10 May 1941 to allow Glavaš to become a member of his ministry. Pandžić accepted the request five days later. Glavaš was appointed the head of the Department of Religion at the Ministry.

With the new position, Glavaš, taught by his own experience, bought the house where Herzegovinian Franciscans could live in Zagreb in 1942. The Herzegovinian Franciscans also used his position to equalise the status of the Franciscan schools with the public schools and to secure the financing for their schools from the state treasury, to become independent from their dioceses and the bishops.

Glavaš also initiated the state-sponsored establishment of the Franciscan Faculty of Theology in Sarajevo for all the Franciscan Provinces in the NDH in 1944. This initiative was opposed by the Church authorities, who insisted that such an educational institution must be established and approved by the Church. Archbishop Aloysius Stepinac of Zagreb wrote against such a move, complaining that the church authorities must not be bypassed. Archbishop Ivan Šarić was also "seriously surprised" by the state establishment of the faculty without the church approval. However, the Franciscans claimed that they have a right to establish the faculty without the church's approval.

Using his post, Glavaš also influenced the appointment of politicians in Herzegovina.

Persection of Serbs 

As an official of the Ministry of Justice and Religion, Glavaš was charged with setting up the procedures and regulations within the programme of the mass conversion of the Eastern Orthodox Serb population to Catholicism. The programme was initiated without any consultation with the Church. The head of the programme was another Franciscan Dionizije Juričev. The auxiliary bishop of Zagreb Josip Lach immediately condemned the move. However, the government ignored the bishop's condemnation, announced the introduction of the new regulations in July 1941 and started recruiting individual priests to carry out the conversions. The Church opposed the forced conversions and insisted that only it can proscribe the conditions for conversion and that the issue is out of the scope of the government. The NDH government intended to organise mass conversions, while the Church held that thorough religious education is necessary before any conversion.

Glavaš's procedure and regulation of the conversion had an aim to eradicate Serb identity from the NDH. He prohibited the educated and the middle-class to be converted in order for them to be killed, deported, or otherwise removed. In the summer and autumn of 1941, individual priests were sent out to rural areas to conduct the conversions, and Serbs agreed to convert fearing for their lives. However, the Ustaše continued to persecute them even after the conversion. After realising that the conversions won't save them, the programme to convert the Serbs became obscure. By 1942, only about two hundred thousand Serbs converted, and the programme was soon abandoned. The intimidating attitude of some priests, especially those in Herzegovina, together with the arbitrariness of conversions, led to the fact that they shook the legitimacy of the entire programme.

Glavaš also managed to get the money earned from the assets of the Serbian Eastern Orthodox churches to the Franciscan friaries.

Čule affair 

Glavaš was involved in an affair of the episcopal appointment in Herzegovina, when a secular priest Petar Čule was named the new bishop of Mostar-Duvno and the apostolic administrator of Trebinje-Mrkan. The episcopal seat was previously held by the Franciscans, who felt that the seat should belong to one of their own. They gained a promise from the Ustaše government via Glavaš that the new bishop would be a Herzegovinian Franciscan.

The Ustaše government complained that Čule's and the appointment of the Greek Catholic bishop Janko Šimrak, occurred without consultation with them. On 3 June 1942, the Ministry of Justice and Religion sent a protest note to all parish priests in Herzegovina in which they demonstrated opposition to his appointment, noting that since Čule was appointed "without knowledge and hearing, even without knowledge of the Croatian State Government, the Croatian State Government cannot recognise such an appointment, and will take its stance accordingly in order to protect the state sovereignty pro foro civili". Glavaš participated in the making of the protest note.

At the time when Pavelić was preparing to celebrate his name day on the feast of Saint Anthony of Padua on 13 June 1942, he was informed by the Pope's delegate Giuseppe Masucci, that if he would hold to this protest note, he would be automatically excommunicated in the accordance with the 2334 Code of Canon Law, and that this would obstruct the celebration of his name day. This persuaded Pavelić to give up any sanctions against Čule. Few days after the protest note was issued, Archbishop of Zagreb Aloysius Stepinac invited a high official in the Ministry of Justice and Religion together with Glavaš, and threatened them both with excommunication if they don't refrain from their actions. Furthermore, the papal delegate Marcone, who was present there, excommunicated Glavaš. Glavaš refused to acknowledge the excommunication, claiming that he had no role in the creation nor spreading of the protest note against Čule's appointment. However, in his statement to the OZNA authorities from 10 June 1945, Glavaš stated that he acknowledged the excommunication and left. Marcone later expressed a wish to see him again, however, Čule refused, staying "firmly in his stance that he has nothing to ask him for nor beg for".

Nonetheless, in July 1942, Glavaš influenced Pavelić to send the Minister of Internal Affairs Andrija Artuković to Mostar, in order to prevent Čule's appointment, but the effort was unsuccessful, mainly because of Stepinac's threats to Glavaš and the Ustaše authorities. The Herzegovinian Franciscans started to persuade Čule to denounce his appointment but to no avail. Stepinac and the Archbishop of Vrhbosna Šarić received threatening letters, in which they were informed that "if you [Stepinac and Šarić] dare to cross the border of the city of Mostar and Herzegovina for the purpose of the consecration of the new bishop, you [Stepinac and Šarić] should know that anything could happen. There will be blood and flesh, even if you would carry the papal tiara. There will be blood and flesh." Marko Perić considers that the threatening letters originate from the Franciscans. Franciscan Oton Knezović, unsatisfied with Čule's appointment, wrote an article in Katolički list (The Catholic Newspaper) regarding the incident, but the article was of such content that Stepinac ordered it to be destroyed.

Aftermath 

Before the entrance of the Partisans in Zagreb, the NDH government took the treasures of the Croatian National Bank, including gold, jewelry, and foreign currency, and put them in 42 boxes. Glavaš helped them hide 32 boxes of gold and other treasure, including money, in the Franciscan monastery in Zagreb, while the rest of the boxes were taken out of the country. OZNA, the Yugoslav secret police, found the boxes in January 1946.

Just before the fall of the NDH regime, Bishop Šimrak testified that he saw Glavaš who was trying to escape Zagreb, or he was returning from the escape. Robert Jolić, a Franciscan historian, states that there are testimonies that Glavaš wasn't trying to escape. In his testimony to OZNA from 10 June 1945, Glavaš said that he at first escaped to Austria, but after witnessing the chaotic situation of the escapees and malnourishment, he decided to return to Zagreb. After the fall of the NDH regime, Glavaš was arrested and tried in June 1945, and was executed afterward.

The British historian Robin Harris wrote that Glavaš was probably the most notorious Ustaše priest.

Notes

References

Books

Journals 

 
 
 

1909 births
1945 deaths
People from Grude
Croats of Bosnia and Herzegovina
Faculty of Humanities and Social Sciences, University of Zagreb alumni
Franciscans of the Franciscan Province of Herzegovina
Ustaše
Croatian collaborators with Nazi Germany
Croatian collaborators with Fascist Italy
Croatian people of World War II
Executed Yugoslav collaborators with Nazi Germany
Executed politicians
Executed Croatian people
20th-century Croatian Roman Catholic priests
People excommunicated by the Catholic Church